Huize County  (old name: Dongchuan 東川) is a county-level city, under the jurisdiction of Qujing City, Yunnan province, People's Republic of China.

Demography
The city has grown considerably over the past 20 years. It has 871,200 inhabitants.

Geography

Huize is located between mountains with rice fields at one side and a large earth dam to the south. Some of the mountain areas are blasted for construction materials.

Administrative divisions
Huize County has 3 subdistricts, 7 towns, 12 townships and 1 ethnic township. 
3 subdistricts
 Gucheng
 Baoyun
 Jinzhong
7 towns

12 townships

1 ethnic township
 Xinjie Hui

Climate
Tempered by the low latitude and moderate elevation, Huize has a mild subtropical highland climate (Köppen Cwb), with short, mild, dry winters, and warm, rainy summers. A great majority of the year's rainfall occurs from June to September.

Transport 
China National Highway 213

Economy
There are several food markets, temples, shops and bars in the county center.

References

External links
Huize County Official Website 

 
County-level divisions of Qujing